Adalberto Palma Ruiz Galindo (born February 3, 1981, in Mexico City) is a former Mexican football player, who last played as a defender for Monarcas Morelia in the Mexican First Division.

External links

Profile at BDFA

1981 births
Living people
Footballers from Mexico City
Liga MX players
C.D. Antofagasta footballers
Expatriate footballers in Chile
Mexican expatriates in Chile
Atlante F.C. footballers
C.F. Mérida footballers
Deportivo Toluca F.C. players
Club Necaxa footballers
Atlético Morelia players
Mexican footballers
Association football defenders